Widget (also known as Widget the World Watcher) is an animated television series created by Voltron creator Peter Keefe, directed and produced by Tom Burton of Zodiac Entertainment, which debuted in syndication on September 29, 1990. The series ran for two seasons; in the first season (1990), it aired once a week (usually on Saturday or Sunday), and in the second season (1991), the series expanded to weekdays. The show featured environmentalist themes and was recognized by the National Education Association as recommended viewing for children.

Overview
The show focused on a short purple extraterrestrial from the planet Widget who could shapeshift  by spinning like a spinning top into different forms. He and a group of young human friends - brothers Kevin and Brian, and their teenage sister Kristine - protect the natural environment from those who wish to plunder or harm it. Later on they are joined by fellow shapeshifter Half-Pint, Widget's mischievous and overly-curious cousin. Widget is frequently accompanied by the Mega Brain, an intelligent but somewhat clumsy being who appears as a floating head (with a transparent cranium) and floating hands.

The show was produced by Calico Creations to teach children about the dangers of pollution. Each episode would have Widget contending with a villain from either Earth or outer space wishing to exploit Earth's environment or natural resources, like Dr. Dante, Mega Slank, and his evil twin, Ratchet. In this respect, Widget, the World Watcher is very similar to Captain Planet and the Planeteers and Toxic Crusaders, as all those heroes attempt to save the Earth from ecological disaster. As in those series, Widget occasionally fought against malicious entities spawned by copious pollution. For example, in one episode Widget battled a fellow shapeshifter; a sentient but hostile life form, disguised as a toxic ooze/slick, who was contaminating Earth's beaches and oceans.

The TV series ran for 65 episodes: 13 in the first season, and 52 in the second season. The animation for the show was produced by South Korean studio; Sei Young Animation.

It also aired on TVO, CFA and Le Canal Famille in Canada and later on ITV, The Children's Channel, Sky One and Channel 4 in the UK, TV3 in Sweden, RTÉ1 and RTÉ2 in Ireland, Sjónvarpið in Iceland, Fun Channel in Chile, Bop TV, SABC1 and M-Net in South Africa, Saudi 2 in Saudi Arabia, Dubai 33 in the United Arab Emirates, KBS, KBS2 and American Forces Korea Network in Korea, Syndication, USA Network and UniMás (with the Spanish-dubbed version aired on Toonturama weekend morning block) in United States, TV1 and TV3 in Malaysia, Channel 55 in Bahrain, Canal+ and FR3 in France, ZBC TV in Zimbabwe, Channel One in Russia, Channel 5 in Singapore, KUAM-TV in Guam, NBC in Namibia, Swazi TV in Eswatini, TVP1, TVP2 and TVP Polonia in Poland, TV2 and TV3 in New Zealand, ProSieben and Armed Forces Network (with the original English recorded version) in Germany, TV3 in Estonia, IBC in the Philippines, RTB in Brunei, Canale 5 in Italy, Channel 2 in Israel, the ABC in Australia and ANT1 in Greece.

Characters
Widget the World Watcher (voiced by Russi Taylor): The courageous and heroic shapeshifting heliotrope alien and the title character.
Mega Brain (voiced by Jim Cummings): Mega Brain is Widget's assistant. He is a rose pink floating head with floating glove-like hands. He has a transparent brain enclosed by a dome on top of his head.
Half-Pint (voiced by Cree Summer): Widget's mischievous, overly-curious, hyperactive cousin, fellow shapeshifter and is the sky blue alien.
Kevin (voiced by Dana Hill): Brian's older brother and a friend of Widget.
Brian (voiced by Kath Soucie): Kevin's younger brother and a friend of Widget.
Kristine (voiced by Kath Soucie): Brian and Kevin's older sister.
Ratchet (voiced by Tress MacNeille): Widget's evil twin, who lives in an alternate dimension. Whereas Widget tries to save the world, Ratchet attempts to pollute it.
Dr. Dante (voiced by Jim Cummings): The natural earth villain and a confidence trickster scientist.
Hubert "Ratty" Ratman: Doctor Dante's main minion.
Mega Slank (voiced by Pat Fraley): The other natural outer space villain; who seems to have a grudge against Widget's kind.
Flim Flam McSham: A two-headed ringmaster who captures creatures from across the universe.
Gyp: Works alongside Flim Flam. She is a slave trader whose loyalty to Flim Flam is quite strong.
Crocorillagator: A crocodile/gorilla/alligator creature, who is one of Ratchet's minions.
Elewolf: An elephant/wolf creature, who is one of Ratchet's minions.
Duckster: A duck/rooster creature, who is one of Ratchet's minions.
Piglion: A pig/lion creature, who is one of Ratchet's minions.

Episodes

Season 1 (1990)

Season 2 (1991)

Principal cast
Jim Cummings - Mega Brain, Dr. Dante, Elder #1
Dana Hill - Kevin
Kath Soucie - Brian, Kristine
Russi Taylor - Widget

Additional voices
Cam Clarke
Townsend Coleman
Peter Cullen - Bob the Poacher, Rooney Kangaroo, Gdunu
Brian Cummings
Pat Fraley - Mega Slank
Tress MacNeille - Ratchet, Elder #2
Cree Summer - Half Pint

Production and distribution
Widget was produced by Zodiac Entertainment, a Studio City, California-based firm backed by British media company Central Independent Television. Zodiac President Kevin Morrison stated that in 1990, Widget was being broadcast on 80% of independent U. S. television stations and that in 1991, the show started being shown five times a week.

Video games
The series spawned two video games. Widget was released by Atlus on the NES in 1992 and Super Widget also by Atlus on the SNES in 1993.

Reception

Accolades
The episode "Sort it Out" won an Environmental Media Award.

References

External links

1990 American television series debuts
1991 American television series endings
1990s American animated television series
American children's animated comedy television series
Animated television series about extraterrestrial life
Environmental television
Fiction about the Horsehead Nebula
Television series about shapeshifting
USA Network original programming